Lichtenau is a small town in Rastatt district in southwestern Baden-Württemberg, Germany.

Geography
Lichtenau is located in the Upper Rhine River Plains on the right bank of the Rhine between Rastatt and Kehl.

Neighboring communities
The city shares borders with the following communities, listed clockwise from the north:  Rheinmünster, Ottersweier, Achern and Rheinau.  West of the city is the Rhine and with it the French border.

Boroughs
The city of Lichtenau consists of Lichtenau (proper), Scherzheim, Ulm, Muckenschopf and Grauelsbaum.

History
Lichtenau developed from a water castle that the Bishop of Strasbourg had built in the years 1293 to 1296, complete with defensive wall, ditch and parapet. In 1300 Lichtenau received its city charter and until its Slighting in 1686 it remained a fortress.  After the line of the Counts of Hanau-Lichtenau ended the city became part of Hesse in 1736 and then was made part of Baden together with the Hanauerland in 1803.

District reform
In Lichtenau the Baden-Württemberg district reform of the 1970s took place in stages.

Government
The city is part of the administrative district of "Rheinmünster-Lichtenau" with seat in Rheinmünster.

City council
In addition to the mayor and city council president the council is made up of 20 members.  The councilmen and councilwomen belong to political parties as follows:

People
Gabriele Frechen (born October 12, 1956), politician.

Twin cities

  Lichtenberg, Bas-Rhin, France

References

This article is based on a translation of an article from the German Wikipedia.

Rastatt (district)